Elysia is a feminine given name that may refer to the following people

Given name
Elysia Crampton American musician
Elysia Rotaru (born 1984), Canadian actress
Elysia Segal (born 1985), American actress

Fictional characters
Princess Elysia, a playable character in the video game Rayman Legends
Miss Pink Elf/Elysia, a playable character in the mobile game Honkai Impact 3rd

See also

Feminine given names